The list of ship commissionings in 1993 includes a chronological list of all ships commissioned in 1993.


See also 

1993
 Ship commissionings